Carl Randau (8 August 1893 - April 1969) was an American playwright and journalist.

Biography
A native of Iowa, he moved to New York City in the 1930s where he was a journalist for the New York World-Telegram.

He was the President of The Newspaper Guild from 1934 to 1940. In 1940, he married Leane Zugsmith. After the Second World War, he and his wife visited Japan and China to work as correspondents for the newspaper PM.

Bibliography
The Setting Sun of Japan (1942) (with Leane Zugsmith)
The Visitor (1944) (with Leane Zugsmith)

References

Writers from Iowa
20th-century American dramatists and playwrights
1893 births
1969 deaths
Journalists from New York City
20th-century American non-fiction writers